The 1995–96 FIBA Women's European Champions Cup was 38th and final edition of the competition, which was refounded the following year as Euroleague Women. It ran from 6 September 1995 to 21 March 1996.

BTV Wuppertal defeated defending champion SG Comense in the final to become the first (and only to date) German team to win the competition since its foundation in 1959. MBK Ružomberok and Bourges Basket also reached the Final Four, with the Slovaks winning the bronze.

First qualifying round

Second qualifying round

Group stage

Group A

Group B

Quarter-finals

Final four
 Sofia, Bulgaria

Semifinals

Final

Individual statistics

Points

Rebounds

Assists

References

Champions Cup
EuroLeague Women seasons